This is a list of civil parishes in the ceremonial county of Oxfordshire, England. There are 322 civil parishes.

Part of the former Oxford County Borough is unparished. Population figures are unavailable for some of the smallest parishes.

See also
 List of civil parishes in England

References

External links
 Office for National Statistics : Geographical Area Listings
Oxfordshire County Council : Parishes
Cherwell District Council : Parish and Town Councils in the Cherwell Area
Oxford City Council : Parish Boundary Review
South Oxfordshire District Council : Parishes
Vale of White Horse District Council : Parish Councils
West Oxfordshire District Council : Town and Parish Councils Information

Civil parishes
Oxfordshire
 
Civil parishes